The 2016 Arkansas State Red Wolves football team represented Arkansas State Red Wolves in the 2016 NCAA Division I FBS football season. The Red Wolves played their home games at Centennial Bank Stadium in Jonesboro, Arkansas and competed in the Sun Belt Conference. They were led by third-year head coach Blake Anderson.

Schedule
Arkansas State announced its 2016 football schedule on March 3, 2016. The 2016 schedule consists of 6 home and away games in the regular season. The Red Wolves will host Sun Belt foes Georgia Southern, Louisiana–Monroe, New Mexico State, and South Alabama, and will travel to Georgia State, Louisiana–Lafayette, Texas State, and Troy. Arkansas State will skip out on two Sun Belt teams this season, Appalachian State and Idaho.

The team will play four non–conference games, two home games against Central Arkansas from the Southland Conference and Toledo from the Mid-American Conference (MAC), and two road games against Auburn from the Southeastern Conference (SEC) and Utah State from the Mountain West Conference.

Schedule Source:

Game summaries

Toledo

at Auburn

at Utah State

Central Arkansas

Georgia Southern

South Alabama

Louisiana–Monroe

at Georgia State

New Mexico State

at #25 Troy

at Louisiana–Lafayette

at Texas State

UCF–Cure Bowl

References

Arkansas State
Arkansas State Red Wolves football seasons
Sun Belt Conference football champion seasons
Cure Bowl champion seasons
Arkansas State Red Wolves football